Flooded grasslands and savannas is a terrestrial biome of the WWF biogeographical system, consisting of large expanses or complexes of flooded grasslands. These areas support numerous plants and animals adapted to the unique hydrologic regimes and soil conditions. Large congregations of migratory and resident waterbirds may be found in these regions. However, the relative importance of these habitat types for these birds as well as more vagile taxa typically varies as the availability of water and productivity annually and seasonally shifts among complexes of smaller and larger wetlands throughout a region.

This habitat type is found on four of the continents on Earth. Some globally outstanding flooded savannas and grasslands occur in the Everglades, Pantanal, Lake Chad flooded savanna, Zambezian flooded grasslands, and the Sudd. The flooded savannas and grasslands are generally the largest complexes in each region.

See also

 Coniferous swamp
 Dambo
 Fen
 Flood-meadow
 Freshwater swamp forest
 Mangroves
 Marsh
 Marsh gas
 Muck (soil)
 Peat
 Peat swamp forest
 Salt marsh
 Shrub swamp
 Water-meadow
 Wet meadow

References

 
Grasslands
Wetlands
Terrestrial biomes